The 2001 Taiwanese legislative election was held on 1 December 2001. All 225 seats of the Legislative Yuan were up for election: 168 elected by popular vote, 41 elected on the basis of the proportional representation based of the nationwide votes received by participating political parties, eight elected from overseas Chinese constituencies on the basis of the proportion of nationwide votes received by participating political parties, eight elected by popular vote among the Taiwanese aboriginal populations. Members served three year terms from February 1, 2002 to February 1, 2005.

Background 
The first national election to be held after Chen Shui-bian's victory in the 2000 presidential election, the election resulted for the first time in the Kuomintang (KMT) losing its majority and President Chen's Democratic Progressive Party to emerging as the largest party in the legislature. However, the Pan-Blue Coalition developed between the Kuomintang, the People First Party and the New Party, enabled the Chinese reunificationist and conservative opposition to muster a slim majority over the pro-Taiwan independence Pan-Green Coalition formed between the Democratic Progressive Party and the Taiwan Solidarity Union. This resulted in much of President Chen's agenda being derailed or deadlocked for the following three years.

Results
The KMT lost its majority for the first time, losing 46 seats and falling to 68 seats. The largest party had become the DPP with 87 seats, followed by the KMT, and the PFP with 46 seats. Various parties and independents held the remainder. The New Party which lost all of its seat except the one seat on Quemoy while the newly formed Taiwan Solidarity Union (TSU) captured 13 seats, with independents holding on to 10 seats. Overall the pan-blue opposition got 115 seats, while the government pan-green got 100 seats. The pan-blue remained majority.

Part of the KMT's loss could be attributed to defections to both the People First Party and Taiwan Solidarity Union. The People First Party formed by James Soong and his supporters after the 2000 presidential elections. Soong had been expelled from the KMT after launching an independent bid for the presidency and narrowly lost the race to Chen Shui-bian. The Taiwan Solidarity Union was formed by supporters of former President and KMT Chairman Lee Teng-hui, who took the title of "spiritual leader" in the party. For this, Lee was also expelled from the KMT. Though the both offshoots of the Kuomintang, the People First Party advocated a more conservative position than the KMT while the Taiwan Solidarity Union took on a radical pro-independence stance. After Lee's expulsion, the KMT and PFP had a warming of relations and cooperated in the election. The more moderate pro-independence Democratic Progressive Party cooperated with the Taiwan Solidarity Union likewise, leading to the formation of the pan-blue and pan-green coalitions.

The KMT's loss in the election could also be attributed partly to the single non-transferable vote scheme in place. Though the DPP won 40% of the seats they only polled 36% of the vote because of the inability of the KMT, PFP, and New Party to coordinate their electoral strategies. Despite winning a plurality of votes in Hualien, vote-splitting between KMT candidates led to the election of one DPP and one PFP candidate instead. This led to more stringent vote allocation strategies by pan-blue in 2004, which helped prevent pan-green from gaining a majority.

References

Taiwan
Legislative elections in Taiwan
2001 elections in Taiwan
Taiwan